Reitz Arena is a multi-purpose arena in Baltimore, Maryland. It is home to the Loyola University Maryland Greyhounds men's and women's basketball teams, as well as the Loyola women's volleyball team. Its seating capacity is 2,100. The arena, adjoining the Andrew White Student Center, has fully retractable seating on both sidelines of the arena to create a full sized ballroom. It replaced the original 1926 Evergreen Gymnasium, directly next to the arena in the Andrew White Student Center.

See also
 List of NCAA Division I basketball arenas

References

College basketball venues in the United States
Sports venues in Baltimore
Indoor arenas in Maryland
Basketball venues in Maryland
Loyola Greyhounds men's basketball